David Gilmour (born 22 December 1949) is a Canadian fiction novelist, former television journalist, film critic, and former professor at the University of Toronto.

Early life
Gilmour was born in London, Ontario, and later moved to Toronto for schooling. He is a graduate of Upper Canada College and the University of Toronto.

He became managing editor of the Toronto International Film Festival in 1980 and held the post for four years. In 1986, he joined CBC Television as a film critic for The Journal, eventually becoming host of the program's Friday night arts and entertainment show. In 1990, he began hosting Gilmour on the Arts, an arts show series on CBC Newsworld.

Career
He left CBC in 1997 to concentrate on his writing. His 2005 novel A Perfect Night to Go to China won the  2005 Governor General's Award for English fiction, and was longlisted for the 2007 International Dublin Literary Award.

In June 2007, Gilmour won two gold National Magazine Awards for his essay "My Life with Tolstoy" which appeared in The Walrus magazine.

Gilmour was a Professor of Literary Studies at Victoria College at the University of Toronto and taught Creative Writing and Literature from 2006 to 2021.

Novels
 Back on Tuesday (1986)
 How Boys See Girls (1991)
 An Affair with the Moon (1993)
 Lost Between Houses (1999)
 Sparrow Nights (2001)
 A Perfect Night to Go to China, Thomas Allen Publishers (2005)
 The Perfect Order of Things, Thomas Allen Publishers (2011)
 Extraordinary, Patrick Crean Editions (2013) (longlisted for the 2013 Scotiabank Giller Prize)

Memoir
 The Film Club, Thomas Allen Publishers  (2007)

References

External links

 David Gilmour

1949 births
Canadian film critics
Canadian male novelists
Canadian television journalists
Governor General's Award-winning fiction writers
Living people
Writers from London, Ontario
University of Toronto alumni
Upper Canada College alumni
Canadian male non-fiction writers